Hungatella effluvii is a Gram-positive, anaerobic and spore-forming bacterium from the genus of Hungatella.

References

Clostridiaceae
Bacteria described in 2014
Bacillota